Scandiano is a town and comune in Emilia-Romagna, in the northeast part of the country of Italy, near the city of Reggio nell'Emilia and the Secchia river. It had a population of 25,663 as of 31 December 2016.

History 

The current residential settlement was founded by one Gilberto Fogliani in 1262 with the construction of the Castle around which some houses developed. Initially built for defensive purposes, it was later transformed into a seigneurial mansion by the Boiardo family (1423–1560) and later into a Renaissance palace by the Marquis Thiene (1565–1623), the Bentivoglio (1623–45) and princes of Este (1645–1796).

Since the 1960s, the town has been an important centre for the production of tiles, connected to the district of Sassuolo.

Title 
As a titular Duke of Modena, the current holder of the title of "Marquis of Scandiano" would be Prince Lorenz of Belgium, Archduke of Austria-Este.

People
Natives of Scandiano are: 
 Poet Matteo Maria Boiardo (1440-1494), whose family ruled Scandiano in the fifteenth century; 
 Biologist Lazzaro Spallanzani, who lived in the eighteenth century.
 Politician Romano Prodi, who served as Prime minister of Italy from 17 May 1996 to 21 October 1998 and from 17 May 2006 to 8 May 2008.
 Medical scientist, oncologist and semiotician Giorgio Prodi.
 Photographer Luigi Ghirri.

Twin towns
 Blansko, Czech Republic, since 1964
 Tubize, Belgium, since 1975
 Almansa, Spain, since 1989

References

Cities and towns in Emilia-Romagna